Moto G9 (stylized by Motorola as moto g9) is a series of Android smartphones developed by Motorola Mobility, a subsidiary of Lenovo. It is the ninth generation of the Moto G family.

Specifications
Some specifications such as wireless technologies and storage will differ between regions.

References

 Mobile phones introduced in 2020
 Android (operating system) devices
Mobile phones with multiple rear cameras

Motorola smartphones